The Ciompi Quartet is a string quartet at Duke University, Durham, North Carolina, United States, where they were founded in 1965 by Italian violinist Giorgio Ciompi. The Quartet has produced twelve recordings (half collaboratively with other artists) since 1991. All members of the Quartet are Duke professors. They have performed both in the U.S. and abroad, visiting places such as Texas, China, Germany, Serbia and more.

External links
 The Ciompi Quartet's web site.

American string quartets
Duke University
Musical groups established in 1965
University musical groups